Venke Knutson (born 20 October 1978) is a Norwegian singer. Since 2003, she has had six top 10 hits in Norway.

Life and career
Venke Knutson was born in Birkeland, in 1978. She was the youngest of three sisters, in a musical family, and she got inspired to sing by her elder sisters.

Early in her life she lived with her family in the United States.

She joined the school choir. Inspired by two older sisters, she applied for music at the Vågsbygd skole (Vågsbygd High School), when the family was about to go back home to Norway.

She used to be an elementary teacher in Norway. She was earlier married to Svenn Kåre Liodden, but they divorced. She married Thomas Wold in 2008.

She debuted in 2003 with the single "Panic", followed by her first album Scared and the singles "Scared" and "Kiss".

Venke Knutson entered the qualifying rounds of the Melodi Grand Prix 2010 (the Norwegian selection process for the Eurovision Song Contest) on 16 January and was voted through to the national "second chance" program, with the song "Jealous 'Cause I Love You", where she was voted through to the national final.

Discography

Albums

Singles

1 Released as airplay singles

References

External links
 Official Fan Club
 Chinese Fan-bar on Baidu

1978 births
Living people
Norwegian pop singers
Melodi Grand Prix contestants
English-language singers from Norway
21st-century Norwegian singers
21st-century Norwegian women singers